S.S.D. Casarano Calcio is an Italian association football club located in Casarano, Apulia. It currently plays in Serie D Apulia.

History 

The club was founded in 1927 playing also in Serie C1 for 20 seasons. In the season 2001–2002 Mario Kempes, the world famous Argentina striker, was the head coach of S.S.D. Casarano Calcio.

The club was refounded in 2006 as A.S.D. Virtus Casarano, but in summer 2012 it does not join in Serie D, due to bankruptcy.

Immediately after on 24 July 2012, the club was again refounded by Eugenio Filograna as S.S.D. Casarano Calcio and was relocated in Promozione Apulia.

Colors and badge 
Its colors are red-azure.

Honours and records 
 Coppa Italia Serie C1:
Champions – 1984–85
  Serie C2:
Champions – 1987–88
Coppa Italia Dilettanti:
Champions – 2008–09, 2018–19

Youth Team honours
 Campionato nazionale Dante Berretti
Champions – 1996–1997

Points record for professionistic championships (With 2 point awarded for win) in the 1987–88 Serie C2 Championship.

Casarano and Calcio Varese are the only clubs to have won at least one Coppa Italia Serie C and one Coppa Italia Dilettanti.

References

External links 
Official homepage

Football clubs in Apulia
Serie C clubs
Association football clubs established in 1927
1927 establishments in Italy
Coppa Italia Serie C winning clubs